Niu Huijun (born January 13, 1969) is a Chinese football referee.

A teacher by profession, she refereed her first international match in 2004 before going onto officiate at the 2005 Southeast Asian games and the 2006 Asian Games.

Niu was selected as one of the officials for the 2007 FIFA Women's World Cup in China and refereed two games - Nigeria v Sweden and Australia v Norway.

References

1969 births
Chinese football referees
Women association football referees
Living people
FIFA Women's World Cup referees